The Book of Images is a collection of poetry by the Bohemian-Austrian poet and novelist Rainer Maria Rilke (1875-1926).  It was first published in 1902 by Axel Juncker Verlag.
 
It consists of individual poems written from 1899 and forward. An extended version was published in 1906, after Rilke had written The Book of Hours, with which scholars link The Book of Images as a phase in the poet's writing.

See also
 1902 in poetry
 Austrian literature

References

1902 books
Austro-Hungarian culture
Poetry by Rainer Maria Rilke
Poetry collections